Pseudophilautus amboli, the Amboli bush frog, is a rare shrub frog species endemic to the Western Ghats (India). It is found in Amboli (the type locality) and Amba in Maharashtra and in Castle Rock, Londa, Jog Falls-Mavingundi, and Kudremukh-Malleshwaram in Karnataka.

Description
The Amboli bush frog is a small frog, though it is medium-sized to large among its relatives. Males have a large and transparent vocal sack when calling. The body is rather robust. Discs of fingertips are much enlarged. Tympanum is dark brown. dorsum is uniform blackish brown. Throat lemon yellowish with minute black spots.

Habitat
In Amboli it was found in extremely disturbed areas close to evergreen forest patches, although it is not known whether or not it occurs in primary evergreen forest. It breeds by direct development.

Threats and conservation action
The major threat to the species is habitat loss and fragmentation due to urbanization and tourism development. It is not known to occur in any protected areas, making habitat protection an urgent priority.

Gallery

References

External links

amboli
Frogs of India
Endemic fauna of the Western Ghats
Fauna of Maharashtra
Fauna of Karnataka
Taxa named by Sathyabhama Das Biju
Amphibians described in 2009